Wanted (Hangul: 원티드) is a South Korean boy band that debuted in 2004 with the album, Like the First. Following the death of member Seo Jae-hyo in a car accident in August 2004, the group went on hiatus for three years before releasing their second album, 7 Dayz & Wanted, in 2007, followed by their third album, Vintage, in 2012. In 2012, their song, "Like You," featuring IU, charted at #14 on Billboard's Kpop Hot 100 chart.

Discography

Albums

Awards and nominations

Mnet Asian Music Awards

References 

K-pop music groups
YG Entertainment artists
South Korean pop music groups
South Korean boy bands
Musical groups established in 2004